The Amasya trials in 1921, were special ad hoc trials, organized by the Turkish National Movement, with the purpose to kill en masse the Greek representatives of Pontus region under a legal pretext. They occurred in Amasya, modern Turkey, during the final stage of the Pontic Greek genocide. The total number of the executed individuals is estimated to be ca. 400-450, among them 155 prominent Pontic Greeks.

Background

The Ottoman genocide policy against the Pontic Greek populations was initiated after the outbreak of World War I (1914), mostly through deportation and forced death marches. This policy of extermination was intensified, after accusations that the Pontic Greek communities supported the Russian army. As a result, the Ottoman authorities deported thousands of local Greeks to the interior of Anatolia. The Ottoman genocide policy took a more violent form in 1917, when Greece entered World War I. A large number of the deported populations died from disease, exhaustion and epidemics during death marches. Those who managed to survive the marches were either raped, subject to forced islamization or murdered. Meanwhile, Turkish irregular band (cete) leaders, like Topal Osman, notorious from his role in the Armenian genocide, were dispatched against the Greeks of Samsun province in 1916.

The same policy continued after the outbreak of the Greco-Turkish War (1919–1922), where groups of irregular Turkish bands acted with the support of the Turkish nationalists of Mustafa Kemal and committed massacres in the Pontus region in 1920–21.

Trials
The Turkish nationalists' aim was to conduct summary trials and executions of the Pontic Greek elite. Thus they would be able to exterminate the main representatives of the Greek community of the Black Sea coastal area under a legal pretext, as part of the still active genocide policy. These "Independence tribunals" were conducted in Amasya, a town in the interior of Anatolia, far from any foreign consulate, in order to avoid the presence of western representatives, since this was considered an "inner case".

From December 1920 the Turkish nationalists started to arrest en masse various Greek representatives from all parts of the Pontus region and imprisoned them in Amasya. The trials began in the end of August 1921, however, no concrete evidence was ever found to link the accused with anti-Turkish activity. There were only abstract claims that some of them supported the Russian army during World War I. In the same fashion, the Turkish nationalists felt offended when they realised after investigation that the jerseys of the local Greek soccer team Pontus Metzifon displayed the colors of the Greek flag (blue and white).

The trials were presided by Emin Bey Gevecioğlu, solicitor from nearby Samsun. After summary proceedings, where insults and berating comments were shouted at the accused persons by the judge, the verdict for the vast majority of them was death, with the pretext that they organized the independence of Pontus. The sentences were handed down immediately.

From August 20 to September 21, 1921, 177 Greeks of the Pontus region were hanged as a result of these proceedings. The exact total number of those executed by the Amasya trials is unknown, while estimations vary from 400 to 450 persons. On 25 September 1921, a local Turkish newspaper, published a list of 155 prominent Pontic Greeks who were hanged in the central square of Amasya.

Those sentenced to death were politicians, businessmen, journalists and religious figures of the local Greek community. Among them was the local assistant bishop of Amasya, Euthemios Zelon, who died in prison from typhus. Nevertheless, the court sentenced him to death posthumously and his dead body was hanged in the central square of the town together with the others.

Aftermath and reactions

The trials and the executions in Amasya by the Turkish movement of Mustafa Kemal succeeded in the extermination of the Pontic Greek elite under a legal pretext, while the total death toll of the Pontic Greek community, as a result of the Ottoman and Turkish policies, from 1915 to 1923, is estimated from 353,000 to 360,000.

Reactions for the atrocities committed occurred both inside and outside Turkey. The hanging of Matthaios Kofidis in Amasya, former member of the Ottoman parliament, who opposed any form of armed resistance movement against the Turkish authorities, caused anger even among the Muslim population of Trebizond, who refused to collaborate with the Turkish nationalists, thus saving the lives of several local Greeks.

Protests were reported in Greece and the United Kingdom. Moreover, countries which had been at that time in alliance with the Turkish nationalists, like France and Italy, also condemned the atrocities. The issue of the extermination of the Pontic Greek population was also raised in the United States Congress on December 22, 1921, by Senator William H. King.

Sentenced to death
Matthaios Kofidis, businessman and politician, former member of the Ottoman parliament.
Nikos Kapetanidis, journalist and newspaper publisher.
Pavlos Papadopoulos, director of the Ottoman bank of Samsun.
Iordanis Totomanidis, director of the tobacco monopoly in Bafra.
Dimosthenes Dimitoglou, banker.
Teachers and students of the Mertsivan Anatolia High School, some of them were players of the school's soccer team "Pontus Merzifon". Three of the teachers killed were a Ch. Evstathiades, a G. Lamprianos, and a D. Theocharides.
Euthemios Zelon, assistant metropolitan bishop of Amasya.
Platon Aivazidis, protosyncellus of Amasya.
Georgios Th. Kakoulidis, merchant.

In absentia
Chrysanthos, metropolitan bishop of Trebizond, latter archbishop of Athens.
Karavaggelis Germanos, metropolitan bishop of Amasya.
Laurentios, metropolitan bishop of Chaldia.

See also
Deportation of Armenian intellectuals on 24 April 1915
 Outline and timeline of the Greek genocide

References

Sources

Abuse of the legal system
History of Amasya
Greek genocide
History of Amasya Province
Ottoman Pontus
Sivas vilayet
Public executions